Kelvin David Moore (born 15 August 1950) is a former Australian rules footballer who played for the Hawthorn Football Club in the Victorian Football League (VFL).

Moore was one of the best full-backs of his era and played in three Hawthorn premierships during his 300-game career between 1970 and 1984.

In 2005, Moore was inducted into the Australian Football Hall of Fame. He won the club's best and fairest award in 1979, was named at full-back in the Hawthorn Team of the Twentieth Century and was an inaugural member of the Hawthorn's Hall of Fame. He was considered unlucky by many not to be selected at full-back in the AFL Team of the Century.

After retiring from the VFL, he played for the Frankston Football Club in the Victorian Football Association (VFA), often as a half-forward. He was later a chairman of selectors for Frankston, St Kilda and Hawthorn, a Hawthorn board member, and an assistant coach for Hawthorn under Peter Schwab.

Honours and achievements 
Hawthorn
 3× VFL premiership player: 1971, 1976, 1978
 2× Minor premiership: 1971, 1975

Individual
 All-Australian team: 1979
 Peter Crimmins Perpetual Memorial Trophy: 1979
 Australian Football Hall of Fame
 Hawthorn Hall of Fame
 Hawthorn Team of the Century
 Hawthorn life member

References

External links
 
 

1950 births
Frankston Football Club players
Hawthorn Football Club players
Hawthorn Football Club Premiership players
Hawthorn Football Club administrators
Peter Crimmins Medal winners
All-Australians (1953–1988)
Australian Football Hall of Fame inductees
Victorian State of Origin players
Living people
Australian rules footballers from Melbourne
Three-time VFL/AFL Premiership players
People from Frankston, Victoria